NBA Development League Executive of the Year may refer to:
 NBA Development League Basketball Executive of the Year Award
 NBA Development League Team Executive of the Year Award